Ramonda may refer to:
Ramonda (fly), a subgenus in the family Tachinidae
Ramonda (plant), a genus in the family Gesneriaceae
Ramonda (character), stepmother of the Marvel Comics superhero Black Panther